The 2018 Latvian Football Cup was the 24th edition of the football tournament. This edition of the competition began on 26 May 2018 and ended on 24 October 2018. Liepāja were the defending champions, having won the final 2–0 over Riga FC.

Format
This season, the Latvian Football Cup was a single elimination tournament between 49 teams. Matches which were level at the end of regulation proceeded to extra time and afterwards to penalties, when needed, to determine the winning club.

First round
Nine first round matches were played from 26 May to 2 June 2018. The draw for the first round was held 15 May 2018.

|}

Second round
Sixteen second round matches were played on 15–18 June 2018. The draw for the second round was held on 5 June 2018.

|}

Third round
Eight third round matches were played from 30 June to 2 July 2018.

|}

Fourth round
Eight fourth round matches were played on 6–7 July 2018. The draw for the fourth round was held on 2 July 2018.

|}

Quarter–finals
Four quarter–final matches were played on 4–6 August 2018. The draw for the quarter–finals was held on 11 July 2018.

|}

Semi–finals
The two semi–final matches were played on 19 September 2018. The draw for the semi–finals was held on 9 August 2018.

|}

Final
The final was played on 24 October 2018.

See also
2018 Latvian Higher League

References

External links 
 LFF.lv
 uefa.com
 talsifk.lv

Latvian Football Cup seasons
Latvian Football Cup
2018 in Latvian football